The Boxing Tournament at the 1958 Asian Games was held in Korakuen Ice Palace, Tokyo, Japan from 28 to 31 May 1958. A total of 62 boxers from 11 nations competed.

The host nation dominated the competition winning six out of ten gold medals, South Korea, Burma and Republic of China (Taiwan) won the remaining gold medals.

Medalists

Medal table

Participating nations
A total of 62 athletes from 11 nations competed in boxing at the 1958 Asian Games:

References
Results

External links
 OCA official website

 
1958 Asian Games events
1958
Asian Games
1958 Asian Games